Rahway Valley Railroad No. 15 is a steam locomotive on display at Steamtown National Historic Site.  It was built by the Baldwin Locomotive Works as Oneida and Western Railroad No. 20 in 1916.

History
In 1926, 20 suffered freeze damage to its bridges when a hostler accidentally left it outside overnight, necessitating its return to Baldwin for repairs. While at Baldwin, 20's slide valve cylinders were replaced with piston valve cylinders. 

20 was sold to the Rahway Valley Railroad in 1937 and renumbered to 15.  It last ran in revenue service in November 28, 1953 before being replaced by #17 a GE 70-ton switcher.  The President of the Railroad, George Clark, did not wish to see No. 15 scrapped however. It was placed in heated undercover storage pending further development for the next six years; at one point it was hoped the engine would be put on public display in Kenilworth, New Jersey, but space surrounding the railroad was limited.

It was donated to F. Nelson Blount in May 1959 and was received at Wakefield, Massachusetts on June 5 that year. Blount chose to restore the locomotive and operate it at Steamtown, U.S.A. in 1962. It also travelled to Boston to be filmed in The Cardinal. The locomotive later became Green Mountain Railroad #15 following the formation of that railroad. It remained under the Green Mountain name until 1973 and was later reverted to Rahway Valley #15.

No. 15's last run was on August 12, 1973, when a boiler tube blew out, scalding Andy Barbera, who was operating as the locomotive engineer at the time. Since the services of the locomotive were not needed at the time, the repairs were not done and remained undone by the time the Steamtown Special History was written. 

The Steamtown Special History Study recommended that the engine be cosmetically and operationally restored, as it had served in the northeastern quarter of the United States and had been serviced, at least once, at the Lackawanna's Scranton shop.

As of 2022, the locomotive is still displayed and inoperable at Steamtown National Historic Site. There aren’t any plans to restore 15 to operation anytime soon.

References

External links

Baldwin locomotives
2-8-0 locomotives
Freight locomotives
Individual locomotives of the United States
Preserved steam locomotives of Pennsylvania